Bacillus isolates have a variety of biotechnological applications.

Nattō-derived 

Nattō-derived Bacillus isolates include nootropics pyrazine and tetramethylpyrazine, as well as the anticoagulant enzyme nattokinase.

Biotechnology 
Bacillus is utilized in the production of the chemotherapy medicine L-asparaginase. Bacillus subtilis is utilized in the production of hyaluronic acid and α-amylase. Bacillus thuringiensis isolates are utilized as biopesticides.

Bacillus megaterium has been an important industrial organism for decades. It produces penicillin amidase used to make synthetic penicillin, various amylases used in the baking industry and glucose dehydrogenase used in glucose blood tests. B. megaterium is also used for the production of pyruvate, vitamin B12, drugs with fungicidal and antiviral properties, etc. It produces enzymes for modifying corticosteroids, as well as several amino acid dehydrogenases.

Bacillus subtilis can biosynthesize silver nanoparticles. Bacillus badius can be used to cleaves penicillin G to 6-amino penicillanic acid (6-APA) and phenyl acetic acid (PAA). Certain Bacillus have mycorrhiza-like activity and potential bioremediation applications.

Bacillus isolates are used industrially as nutritional probiotics. Additional Bacillus isolates include gamma-D-Glutamyl-meso-diaminopimelate peptidase, sonorensin, gamma-cyclodextrin,  2,5-Diketopiperazines, laccases, bacteriocin, paenicidin A, tridecaptin A₁, and paenicidin B.

See also

References

External links 
Bacillus subtilis antibiotics: structures, syntheses and specific functions
Bioremediation of fipronil by a Bacillus firmus isolate from soil 
Bioprospecting for Microbial Endophytes and Their Natural Products - 2003

Bacillus
Bacillaceae
Bacteria
Pharmaceutical isolates